Eleanor is a feminine given name, originally from an Old French adaptation of the Old Provençal name Aliénor. It is the name of a number of women of royalty and nobility in western Europe during the High Middle Ages.
The name was introduced to England by Eleanor of Aquitaine, who came to marry King Henry II. It was also borne by Eleanor of Provence, who became Queen consort of England as the wife of King Henry III, and Eleanor of Castile, wife of Edward I.

The name was popular in the United States in the 1910s and 1920s, peaking at rank 25 in 1920. It declined below 600 by the 1970s, again rose to rank 32 in the 2010s. Eleanor Roosevelt, the longest-serving first lady of the US was probably the most famous bearer of the name in contemporary history.

Common hypocorisms include Elle, Ella, Ellie, Elly, Leonor, Leonora, Leonore, Nella, Nellie, Nelly, and Nora.

Origin

The name derives from the Provençal name Aliénor, which became Eléonore in Langue d'oïl, i.e., French, and from there Eleanor in English.

The origin of the name is somewhat unclear; one of the earliest bearers appears to have been Eleanor of Aquitaine (1120s–1204). She was the daughter of Aénor de Châtellerault, and it has been suggested that having been baptized Aenor after her mother, she was called alia Aenor, i.e. "the other Aenor" or Aliénor in childhood and would have kept that name in adult life. 
Some sources say that the name Aénor itself may be a Latinization of an unknown Germanic name.

Eleanor of Aquitaine, the most powerful woman in 12th century Europe, was certainly the reason for the name's later popularity. However, the name's origin with her, and the explanation of alia Aenor is uncertain; there are records of possible bearers of the name Alienor earlier in the 12th, or even in the 11th or 10th centuries,
but the records of these women post-date Eleanor of Aquitaine, at a time when Alienor had come to be seen as an equivalent variant of the name Aenor (so that presumably, these women during their own lifetime used the given name Aenor):

 Alienor, wife (b. 899) (married 935) of Aimery II, Viscount of Thouars, and mother of Herbert I (born 960).
 Aleanor de Thouars (1050-1088/93), grandmother of Aénor of Châtellerault, and thus Eleanor of Aquitaine's great-grandmother. Born c. 1060 as a daughter of Aimery IV of Thouars and Aurengarde de Mauleon. Her name is also cited in some documents as Adenor, Aenors and Aleanor/Alienor, and may have been corrupted to Alienor in genealogies only after the 12th century.
 Eleanor of Normandy, aunt of William the Conqueror, was so named by the 17th-century genealogist Pierre de Guibours, but de Guibours' sources for this remain unknown.
 Eleanor of Champagne (1102–1147), in 1125 became the first wife of Ralph I, Count of Vermandois, who was displaced by Eleanor of Aquitaine's sister Petronilla of Aquitaine, leading to war (1142–44) in Champagne.

Variants 
 Breton: Azenor
 English: Eleanor, Elinor
 Estonian: Eleonoora, Ellinor
 French: Eléonore, Éléonore, Léonore, Elléonore, Eléanor, Éléanor, Éléanore, Aliénor, Aénor
 German: Eleonore
 Greek: Ελεονώρα
 Hungarian, Slovakian: Eleonóra
 Irish: Eileanóra, Elienor
 Italian, Dutch, Polish: Eleonora
 Latvian: Eleonora
 Occitan: Alienor, Alienòr
 Portuguese: Leonora, Leonor
 Provençal: Lenoa, Leno
 Spanish: Leonor
 Swedish: Eleanora, Ellinor, Elleonore, Elna

Notable people

Medieval 

 Eleanor of Normandy (b. 1011/1013, d. after 1071), daughter of Richard II of Normandy.
 Eleanor of Aquitaine (ca. 1122–1204), wife of Louis VII of France and Henry II of England, mother of Richard I and King John
 Eleanor of England, Queen of Castile (1161–1214), daughter of Henry II of England and Eleanor of Aquitaine; wife of Alfonso VIII of Castile
 Eleanor, Fair Maid of Brittany (1184–1241), daughter of Geoffrey, Duke of Brittany
 Eleanor of Brittany (abbess) (1285-1342), granddaughter of Eleanor of Provence and Henry III, and later Abbess of Fontevraud 
 Eleanor of Castile (1202-1244) (1202–1244), wife of James I of Aragon
 Eleanor of England, Countess of Leicester (1215–1275), daughter of King John of England, wife of Simon de Montfort, 6th Earl of Leicester
 Eleanor of Provence (1222–1291), wife of Henry III of England, mother of Edward I
 Eleanor of Castile (1241–1290), wife of Edward I of England, mother of Edward II
 Eleanor of England, Countess of Bar (1269–1298), daughter of Edward I, betrothed to Alfonso III of Aragon, and wife of Henry III of Bar
 Eleanor of Anjou (1289-1341), daughter of Charles II of Naples and Mary of Hungary, and wife of Frederick III of Sicily
 Eleanor de Clare (1292-1337), granddaughter of Edward I of England and wife of Hugh Despenser the Younger
 Eleanor of Castile (1307-1359) (1307–1359), wife of Alfonso IV of Aragon
 Eleanor of Woodstock (1318–1355), daughter of Edward II, wife of Reynold II, Count of Gelderland
 Eleanor of Arborea (1347 – 1404), Sardinian judge
 Eleanor of Sicily (1349-1375), wife of Peter IV of Aragon
 Leonor Telles de Menezes (1350–1386), wife of Ferdinand I of Portugal
 Eleanor of Castile (d. 1416) (136x–1416), wife of Charles III of Navarre
 Eleanor of Aragon, Queen of Portugal (1402–1445) wife of Edward I of Portugal
 John/Eleanor Rykener, a 14th-century (possibly transgender) prostitute

Modern 
 Eleanor of Viseu (1458–1525), wife of John II of Portugal
 Eleanor of Austria (1498–1558), Queen consort of Portugal (1516–1521) and of France (1530–1547)
 Eleanor of Toledo (1522–1562), Spanish noblewoman and Duchess and Regent of Florence (1539)
 Eleonore Batthyány-Strattmann (1672–1741), Viennese court lady
 Elleanor Eldridge (c.1784-c.1845), African American/Native American entrepreneur
 Eleanor Anne Porden (1795–1825), English poet
 Eleanor Macomber (1801–1840), missionary, teacher
 Eleonora Duse (1858 –1924), Italian actress
 Ellinor Aiki (1893–1969), Estonian painter
 Eleanor Audley (1905–1991), American actress
 Eleanor Boardman (1898–1991), American actress
 Eleanor Kearny Carr (1840–1912), American political hostess
 Eleonora Chiavarelli (1915–2010), wife of Aldo Moro
 Eleanor Glanville (1654–1709), English entomologist and naturalist
 Elinor Glyn (1864–1943), British novelist
 Eleanor Gwynn (known colloquially as "Nell") (1650-1687), Restoration actress and mistress of Charles II of England
 Ulrika Eleonora of Sweden, its reigning queen 1719-1720
 Eleonora, three 17th century Swedish queens consort
 Countess Palatine Eleonora Catherine of Zweibrücken, Swedish princess
 Eleanor Maria Easterbrook Ames (1831-1908), American writer, publisher
 Eleanor Marx (1855–1898), British writer and daughter of Karl Marx
 Eleanor Modrakowska (1879–1955), American painter
 Eleanor Porter (1868–1920), American novelist
 Eleanor Rathbone (1872–1946), British politician
 Elenore Abbott (1875–1935), American painter and book illustrator
 Elinore Pruitt Stewart (1876–1933), American homesteader in Wyoming and memoirist
 Eleanour Sinclair Rohde (1881-1950), British garden designer
 Eleanor Farjeon (1881–1965), British writer
 Eleanor Roosevelt (1884–1962), First Lady of U.S., wife of President Franklin Roosevelt
 Eleanor Soltau (1877–1962), English doctor
 Elinor Wylie (1885–1928), American writer
 Eleanor Butler Roosevelt (1888-1960), American philanthropist
 Eleanor Wilson McAdoo (1889-1967), American author and the youngest daughter of President U.S. Woodrow Wilson
 Eleanor Lansing Dulles (1895–1996), American economist and diplomat
 Eleanor Agnes Lee (1841–1873), diarist, poet, and daughter of Robert E. Lee
 Elinor Fair (1903–1957), American actress
 Eleanor Campbell King (1906–1991), American modern dancer and choreographer
 Eleanor Hibbert (1906–1993), British novelist
 Elinor Smith (1911–2010), American aviator
 Eleanor Powell (1912–1982), American tap dancer and actress
 Eleanor Ruggles (1916-2008), American biographer
 Eleonore Schönborn (1920–2022), Austrian politician
 Eleanor Parker (1922-2013), American actress
 Eleanor Roosevelt Seagraves (born 1927), American librarian, educator, historian, and editor
 Eleanor Helin (1932–2009), American astronomer
 Elinor Ostrom (1933–2012), American political scientist and Nobel prize winner
 Elinor Donahue (born 1937), American actress
 Eleanor Duckworth (born 1935), Canadian psychologist and educator
 Eleanor Holmes Norton (born 1937), American politician
 Eleanor Bron (born 1938), British actress and author
 Eleanor Montgomery (1946–2013), American high jumper
 Eleanor Bodel (born 1948), Swedish singer
 Eleanor Warwick King (born 1957), British appellate court judge
 Eleanor Smith (born 1957), British politician
 Eleanor Laing (born 1958), British politician
 Eleanor McEvoy (born 1967), Irish musician, singer/songwriter
 Eleanor Mears (1917–1992), Scottish medical practitioner and campaigner
 Elinor Middlemiss (born 1967), Scottish badminton player
 Eleanor Friedberger (born 1976), American musician
 Eleonora Dziekiewicz (born 1978), Polish volleyball player
 Ellie Reeves (born 1980), British politician
 Éléonore Caroit (born 1985), French politician
 Eleanor James (born 1986), English actress
 Eleonora "Ellen" van Dijk (born 1987), Dutch road and track cyclist
 Elinor Joseph (born 1991), Israeli soldier
 Eleanor Tomlinson (born 1992), English actress
 Eleonore von Habsburg (born 1994), Austrian model
 Eleanor Lee (born 1999), Singaporean actress, singer and model
 Eleanor Worthington Cox (born 2001), English actress

Fictional characters
 Eleanora, principal woman's role in Strindberg's 1901 play Easter
 Ellenore, guest player character portrayed by Marisha Ray in L.A. by Night
 Eleanor, supporting character in the video game Rule of Rose
 Eleanor, supporting character in the video game The Walking Dead: A New Frontier
 Eleanor "Ellie" Arroway, in the 1985 novel Contact by Carl Sagan
 Elenore Baker, supporting character in the anime Madlax
 Ellie Bishop, in the television series NCIS
 Eleanor Bonneville, a supporting character from the movie Jigsaw (2017 film)
 Eleanor Butterbean, in the television series The Grim Adventures of Billy and Mandy
 Elinor Dashwood, in the 1811 novel Sense and Sensibility by Jane Austen
 Eleanor Douglas, in the 2013 young adult novel Eleanor & Park, written by Rainbow Rowell
 Elanor Gardner, daughter of Samwise Gamgee in J.R.R Tolkien's The Lord of the Rings
 Princess Eleanor Matilda Henstridge, in the television series The Royals
 Eleanor Hume, a main character from the videogame Tales of Berseria
 Eleanor Lamb, one of the main protagonists of BioShock 2 by Irrational Games
 Eleanor Miller, one of the members of the female chipmunk music artist band The Chipettes
 Ellie Nash, in Degrassi: The Next Generation
 Eleanor Oliphant, protagonist of Eleanor Oliphant is Completely Fine
 Elinor Rabbit, the titular protagonist often accompanied by Olive and Ari in the animated PBS Kids series Elinor Wonders Why
 Eleanor Savage, love interest, therapeutic friend, and conversational other to protagonist Amory Blaine in F. Scott Fitzgerald's This Side of Paradise
 Eleanor Shellstrop, the protagonist of American fantasy sitcom The Good Place
 Queen Elenoir Siegwald, a character in the Filipino Webtoon series Mage & Demon Queen
 Eleanor Tilney, in the 1803 novel Northanger Abbey by Jane Austen
 Eleanor of Tristain, in the novels and anime The Familiar of Zero
 Elinor Tyrell, handmaid to Margaery Tyrell in the A Song of Ice and Fire series
 Eleanor “Nell” Vance, in The Haunting of Hill House
 Eleanor Waldorf, mother of a protagonist, Blair Waldorf, in TV series Gossip Girl
 Ellie Woodcomb, in the television series Chuck
 Miss Ellie Ewing Eleanor Southworth Ewing Farlow, the matriarch of the Ewing family in the CBS drama series Dallas
 Queen Elinor, in the Disney/Pixar movie Brave

Music
 "Elenore," a 1968 song by The Turtles.
 "Eleanor Rigby," a 1966 song by The Beatles.
 "Lady Eleanor," a 1971 song by Lindisfarne.
 "Eleanor Put Your Boots On", a 2006 song by Franz Ferdinand.

Animals
 Eleonora cockatoo, a parrot.

Vehicles
 Eleanor (automobile), the vehicle used in Gone in 60 Seconds (1974) as well as the 2000 remake.

See also

Notes

References

French feminine given names
English feminine given names